Ferran Terra (born 10 March 1987) is an alpine skier from Spain.  He competed for Spain at the 2010 Winter Olympics where his best result was 27th in the super-G.

Olympic results

References

External links

1987 births
Spanish male alpine skiers
Alpine skiers at the 2010 Winter Olympics
Alpine skiers at the 2014 Winter Olympics
Olympic alpine skiers of Spain
Living people